David Carter and Paul Kronk were the defending champions, but Kronk did not participate this year.  Carter partnered Chris Lewis, losing in the first round.

Chip Hooper and Mel Purcell won the title, defeating Tian Viljoen and Danie Visser 6–4, 7–6 in the final.

Seeds

  Pat Du Pré /  Terry Moor (second round, defaulted)
  David Carter /  Chris Lewis (first round)
  Marcos Hocevar /  João Soares (second round)
  Shlomo Glickstein /  Steve Krulevitz (second round)

Draw

Draw

External links
Draw

1982 Grand Prix (tennis)
1982 BMW Open